Ranks of the Grande Armée describes the military ranks and the rank insignia used in Napoleon's Grande Armée. Officers and the most senior non-commissioned rank had rank insignia in the form of epaulettes, sergeants and corporals in the form of stripes or chevrons on the sleeves.

Infantry and artillery 
Gold (yellow) or silver (white) stripes and epaulettes were used in accordance with the metal of the uniform buttons of the regiment. Officers of regiments with gold buttons used gold epaulettes, those with silver buttons wore silver epaulettes. Generals and field officers used bullion fringes. Gold and silver were also often used in accordance to the Regiments designation as a Ligne (line) regiment would frequent gold while a Legere (light) regiment would frequent silver.

Sources:

Cavalry and train

Physicians, surgeons, and pharmacists

Good conduct badges
Sergeants, corporals and privates were issued good conduct and long service badges,  in the form of chevron on the upper left arm of the uniform coat; one chevron for ten years' service, two for 15 years' service, three for 20 years' service. The chevrons were officially of red cloth for all ranks, except caporal-fourriers who were issued chevrons in yellow or white cloth (depending on the metal colour), as a replacement for the stripe that denoted his rank. In reality, however, the sergeants used chevrons in yellow or white.

Gallery

See also
Uniforms of La Grande Armée
Ranks in the French Army
French Army

References

La Grande Armée
Military ranks of France
Military insignia